Ker Block is an historic building in Victoria, British Columbia, Canada.  It is a two-storey brick commercial building built in 1909.

See also
 List of historic places in Victoria, British Columbia

References

External links
 

1909 establishments in Canada
Buildings and structures completed in 1909
Buildings and structures in Victoria, British Columbia